Daisy Dormer (born Kezia Beatrice Stockwell, 16 January 1883 – 13 September 1947) was a British music hall performer.

Early life
Kezia Beatrice Stockwell was born on 16 January 1883 in Southsea to Mary and Henry John Stockwell.  Her father was  a riveter at HM Dockyard Portsmouth. She began her stage career as a dancer in her home town at the age of six. She was pretty, slight and dark haired and projected a figure of innocence.

Career
She started her performing career as Dainty Daisy Dimple and appeared in theatres and music halls under this name until February 1901 when she announced in The Era that she ‘will in future be known as Dainty Daisy Dormer’.

The song which launched her career was a Charles Collins and Tom Mellor composition, “I Wouldn’t Leave My Little Wooden Hut For You” which she first sang in 1905.

A pretty, waif-like presence, Dormer sang "After the Ball is Over" among other popular songs. "After the Ball is Over", which was written by Charles K. Harris, helped to establish Tin Pan Alley as a centre for the music business in the 1890s.  The sheet music sold over five million copies in the 1890s.

Pantomime

Daisy had a long career in pantomime, appearing as Queen Zaza in "Hop-O'-My-Thumb" at the Theatre Royal, Drury Lane production in 1911. The cast also included Barry Lupino, Will Evans, George Graves and Violet Loraine. In 1915, Daisy appeared as Principal Girl, Goody, in "Goody Two Shoes" at the Prince's Theatre, Park Row, Bristol. Lupino Lane was also in the cast.

Film 
Daisy appeared in only one silent movie, 'Potted Pantomimes' directed by W.P. Kellino, starring famous stage star Lillian Russell and music hall comedians the Egbert Brothers made at Vaudefilms (Gaumont) Film Co in 1914.

She appeared in one talkie playing the role as Mrs. Deakin in 'City of Beautiful Nonsense' with Emlyn Williams in 1935.

Personal life
She married Albert Jee in April 1908, better known by his stage name, Albert Egbert, one half of the Egbert Brothers.  They ran The Sun Hotel in Godalming.

Death
Daisy Dormer died at her home in Clapham, London on 13 September 1947.  She was cremated at Streatham Park Cemetery.

Her name is commemorated by ‘Daisy Dormer Court’ on the Trinity Gardens estate in Brixton.

Works 
Her other songs included the following:
 Hey! Ho! Can't You Hear the Steamer by Harry Gifford and Fred Godfrey
 Colombo (On My Catamaran) by AJ Mills and Bennett Scott
 Where the Black-Eyed Susans Grow by Dave Radford and Richard A Whiting
 Some Sunday Morning by Gus Khan, Raymond Egan and Richard A Whiting
 When You're A Long, Long Way From Home by Sam M Lewis and Geo W Meyer
 The Girl in the Clogs and Shawl by Harry Castling and C. W. Murphy
 There's a Light That's Burning in the Window by Ballard Macdonald, Joe Goodwin & Harry Puck
 Fares Please! (The Tram-Conductor Girl) by Bert Lee
 Dancing 'Neath the Irish Moon by Harry Puck and Ballard Macdonald
What You've Got, Look After! by Charles Collins and EW Rogers
When Will the Sun Shine for Me? by Benny Davis and Abner Silver
I Like Your Old French Bonnet by Tom Mellor, Alf J Lawrance and Harry Gifford
Why Don't You Come Around and See Me? by Tom Mellor, Alf J Lawrance and Harry Gifford
If You Don't Wants Lots of Gold by Tom Mellor, Alf J Lawrance and Harry Gifford

References

External links
Numerous photographs

1883 births
1947 deaths
Music hall performers
Musicians from Portsmouth
20th-century English singers
20th-century English women singers
Actresses from Portsmouth